Rockingham may refer to:

People
 Marquess of Rockingham, a British title of nobility whose holders included:
 Charles Watson-Wentworth, 2nd Marquess of Rockingham (1730–1782), Prime Minister of Great Britain

Places

Australia
 City of Rockingham
 Rockingham, Western Australia
 East Rockingham, Western Australia
 Electoral district of Rockingham, a State Electoral District in Western Australia
 Rockingham Bay, Queensland

Canada
 Rockingham, Nova Scotia
 École Rockingham School, an elementary school in Halifax, Nova Scotia
 Rockingham, community in Brudenell, Lyndoch and Raglan Township, Ontario

Ireland
 Rockingham House, Boyle, a large country house in Boyle, County Roscommon, Ireland

United Kingdom
 Rockingham, Northamptonshire, England
Rockingham Castle
Rockingham Forest 
Rockingham Motor Speedway

United States
 Rockingham, Georgia
 Rockingham, Missouri
 Rockingham, New Jersey, an unincorporated community
 Rockingham (house), an historic house in Rockingham, NJ
 Rockingham, North Carolina, in Richmond County
 Rockingham Speedway ("The Rock"), a former NASCAR track located outside of Rockingham, NC
 Rockingham, Vermont
 Rockingham Avenue, Brentwood, Los Angeles, CA; the location of O.J. Simpson's former estate
 Rockingham County, New Hampshire
 Rockingham Park, horse racing and former motor racing track in Salem, New Hampshire
 Rockingham County, North Carolina
 Rockingham County, Virginia
 Rockingham Township, Iowa

Other uses
 Rockingham (album), an album by the band Nerf Herder
 Rockingham (horse), a British Thoroughbred racehorse
 Rockingham ministry (disambiguation), British governments led by Lord Rockingham
 Operation Rockingham, a British government codename relating to operations with regard to Iraq
 Rockingham Pottery, a 19th-century Yorkshire manufacturer of porcelain that benefitted from the patronage of the descendants of the Marquesses of Rockingham
 , United States' navy ship

See also